Licancel Airport ,  is an airport serving the Celulosa Arauco Licancel wood pulp plant  west of Licantén, a town in the Maule Region of Chile.

The airport lies in a narrow strip between the J-60 highway and the Mataquito River. There is high terrain to the north and west of the runway, and a dropoff into the river on the south.

See also

Transport in Chile
List of airports in Chile

References

External links
OpenStreetMap - Licancel
OurAirports - Licancel
FallingRain - Licancel Airport

Airports in Chile
Airports in Maule Region